Canadian singer and songwriter Grimes has released five studio albums, one remix album, one DJ mix, three extended plays (EPs), thirteen singles (including five as a featured artist), four promotional singles and twenty-one music videos. Born and raised in Vancouver, Grimes began recording experimental music while attending McGill University in Montréal, where she became involved with the underground music scene.

Grimes named herself after grime music after discovering the existence of the genre via Myspace. In January 2010, she released her debut album, Geidi Primes on Arbutus Records, followed by Halfaxa, in September of that year. In late 2011, she announced that she had signed with 4AD, who partnered with Arbutus Records to release her third studio album, Visions, in January 2012. Visions met critical acclaim and was hailed by The New York Times as "one of the most impressive albums of the year so far". Her fourth album, 2015's Art Angels, was her first to chart in top 40 in a number of countries.

Grimes' music has been noted by critics and journalists for its atypical combination of vocal elements, as well as a wide array of influences, ranging from electronica to pop, hip hop, R&B, noise rock, and even medieval music.

In 2013, Grimes was awarded the Webby Award for Artist of the Year and a Juno Award for Electronic Album of the year.

As of March 2021, Grimes's albums have earned 736,000 consumption units, of which 307,000 are album sales and 554 million on-demand song streams in the United States, according to MRC Data.

Albums

Studio albums

Remix albums

DJ mixes

Extended plays

Singles

As lead artist

As featured artist

Promotional singles

Other charted songs

Guest appearances

Music videos

Notes

References

External links
 
 
 
 

Discographies of Canadian artists
Electronic music discographies
Pop music discographies
Discography